John L. Harmer (28 April 1934 – 6 December 2019) was an American politician who served in the California State Senate as a Republican from 1966 to 1974. Harmer served as the Lieutenant Governor of California from 1974 to 1975. He was also the founder of the Lighted Candle Society and the author of several books. Harmer was also a member of the Church of Jesus Christ of Latter-day Saints.

Early life
John L. Harmer was born in 1934 in Salt Lake City, Utah. His parents were Earl W. Harmer and Mabel Spande. He was one of their five children. Harmer attended the University of Utah. While there, Harmer was part of the Frosh Handbook committee in 1954, that helped inform new freshmen about college life at the university. They made sure freshmen were aware of school events and activities. He was involved with debate, and was an intramural debate finalist in 1954. Harmer was part of the Phi Eta Epsilon fraternity. He was also one of the school's Vigilantes. These vigilantes were campus policemen who played roles in student government. They were also responsible for being judges for school elections.

Harmer later obtained a law degree from George Washington University. Harmer was involved with the student court, serving as the Chief Justice of the student court in 1959. He married Carolyn Jonas on June 24, 1960, in the Los Angeles Temple and the couple had 10 children. Harmer was a member of the Church of Jesus Christ of Latter-day Saints. Throughout his life, Harmer has been interested in astronomy.

Career

Republican Party
Harmer was a member of the Republican Party. He first entered politics by participating in Dwight D. Eisenhower's political campaign in 1952. He was later an aide to U.S. Senator Wallace Bennett hired through the U.S. Department of the Interior's Bureau of Land Management. After, Harmer worked as an attorney in Glendale, California. Before his election as a state senator, Harmer was also the director of public affairs with the National Association of Manufactures; he also worked for the Americans for Constitutional Action as a field representative. In 1966, Harmer was a member of the Republican State Central Committee,  State Central Committee, United Republicans of California, as well as being part of California Republican Associates, Young Republicans, and Republican Associates. By this time, he had also founded the San Fernando Valley Business and Professional Association.

California State Senate
Harmer served in the California State Senate as a Republican from 1966 to 1974. During his time in the senate, he authored SB 462, along with Anthony Beilenson, Alan Short, and Lewis F. Sherman. This act pertained to abortion. Harmer ran for attorney general in 1970 and lost. He resigned from the California State Senate in 1974 and ran for the United States Senate in 1976, but lost.

In 1970 while serving in the state senate and a candidate for state attorney general, Harmer sought permission to film a Los Angeles production of Oh! Calcutta! to gather evidence for his suit to prevent "irreparable damage to the morals of the community."

He went on to serve briefly as the 40th Lieutenant Governor of California from 1974 to 1975, after the resignation of Edwin Reinecke on October 4, 1974 due to being convicted of perjury. Departing Governor Ronald Reagan appointed him to the post. He only served for three months to cover the rest of Reinecke's term. Harmer was referred to, however, as "one of the legislature's most conservative members."

While living in California, Harmer was a regent of the University of California. He also served as a trustee of the California State University System and was a chairman for the Legislature Select Committee on Large Urban School Districts.

Other contributions
He and his family moved to Bountiful, Utah in 1980 and later moved to Lindon, Utah. In Utah, Harmer was appointed the chairman of the National Center for Constitutional Studies. He also worked as a private attorney. He fought to eliminate indecency on cable television programs. In 1988, he was appointed chairman of Eyring, Inc.

In 1999, Harmer traveled to Moscow, Russia as an attorney and was briefed in the U.S. Embassy on the Soviet Union's plans to use germ warfare against the U.S. in the 1970s and 1980s. This experience influenced him to write the book Ere His Floods of Anger Flow.

Harmer became vice president of Geely-USA, the American Division of the Chinese car maker Geely that along with Chery is one of the first Chinese automobile manufacturers to export to North American shores. Harmer founded the Lighted Candle Society in 2001. He served as chairman of the Lighted Candle Society, an organization opposed to pornography, and has filed briefs with the United States Supreme Court against pornography.

Harmer authored several books including We Dare Not Fail (1968), Among the Living Are the Dead (1970), and The Sex Industrial Complex (2007). He also wrote Reagan: Man of Principle.

References

External links
Indian Affairs in California, MSS 8512 at L. Tom Perry Special Collections, Brigham Young University. Includes Harmer's correspondence on Native American affairs.
Article on Harmer and Geely USA Inc.
Join California John L. Harmer

1934 births
2019 deaths
Politicians from Salt Lake City
University of Utah alumni
George Washington University Law School alumni
Latter Day Saints from Utah
Latter Day Saints from California
Republican Party California state senators
Lieutenant Governors of California
Utah Republicans
Writers from California
Writers from Salt Lake City
California lawyers
Utah lawyers
People from Bountiful, Utah
People from Lindon, Utah
University of California regents
21st-century American male writers
20th-century American male writers
20th-century American politicians
Harold B. Lee Library-related 20th century articles